Metopaster is an extinct genus of sea star that lived from the Late Cretaceous to the Early Eocene.  Its fossils have been found in Europe.

Sources
 Fossils (Smithsonian Handbooks) by David Ward (Page 188)

External links
Metopaster in the Paleobiology Database

Goniasteridae
Prehistoric starfish genera
Cretaceous echinoderms
Paleocene echinoderms
Eocene animals
Prehistoric echinoderms of Europe
Late Cretaceous genus first appearances
Eocene genus extinctions